Mufumbwe is a town of Mufumbwe District in the North-Western Province of Zambia. It is located at 13°41'0S
24°48'0E with an altitude of 1069 metres (3510 feet).

The main economic activity of the town is Agriculture with most of the population being involved in small scale farming. The main crop grown in the area is maize. Most households in Mufumbwe maintain a year-round stock of maize which they use to make maize meal. The maize meal "Bunga" in Kikaonde the main Language of the Town is the staple food in Mufumbwe.

The District has two chiefdoms namely Chizela and Mushima. There are a total of 16 wards, namely Kashima west, Kashima East, Matushi, Munyambala, Kamabuta, Kalambo (Township), Chizela, Shukwe, Kikonge, Kalengwa, Kabipupu, Musonweji, Kaminzekenzeke, Mushima, Lalafuta and Miluji.

References

Populated places in North-Western Province, Zambia